Smithville is a city in DeKalb County, Tennessee, United States. The population was 5,004 at the 2020 census, up from 3,994 at the 2010 census. It is the county seat of DeKalb County.  Smithville is home to the Smithville Fiddler's Jamboree, which it has hosted annually since 1972.

Geography
Smithville is located in central DeKalb County at  (35.957191, -85.820756). U.S. Route 70 passes through the town as Broad Street, leading east  to Sparta and northwest  to Lebanon.

Climate

Demographics

2020 census

As of the 2020 United States census, there were 5,004 people, 1,631 households, and 1,090 families residing in the city.

2000 census
As of the census of 2000, there were 3,994 people, 1,675 households, and 1,065 families residing in the city. The population density was 679.4 people per square mile (262.3/km2). There were 1,837 housing units at an average density of 312.5 per square mile (120.6/km2). The racial makeup of the city was 94.34% White, 2.73% African American, 0.15% Native American, 0.10% Asian, 1.65% from other races, and 1.03% from two or more races. Hispanic or Latino of any race were 4.06% of the population.

There were 1,675 households, out of which 27.9% had children under the age of 18 living with them, 43.0% were married couples living together, 16.9% had a female householder with no husband present, and 36.4% were non-families. 33.4% of all households were made up of individuals, and 15.1% had someone living alone who was 65 years of age or older. The average household size was 2.27 and the average family size was 2.85.

In the city, the population was spread out, with 22.9% under the age of 18, 8.9% from 18 to 24, 26.4% from 25 to 44, 22.3% from 45 to 64, and 19.6% who were 65 years of age or older. The median age was 38 years. For every 100 females, there were 83.2 males. For every 100 females age 18 and over, there were 78.0 males.

The median income for a household in the city was $22,482, and the median income for a family was $30,179. Males had a median income of $29,231 versus $20,705 for females. The per capita income for the city was $16,854. About 15.4% of families and 22.2% of the population were below the poverty line, including 28.3% of those under age 18 and 25.8% of those age 65 or over.

In popular culture
Smithville is referred to by a local-boy Marine talking to a girl and pointing to labels on a map during a dance hall scene, 17 minutes into the 1949 World War II John Wayne film, Sands of Iwo Jima, where it is mentioned, apart from everybody in his family being related to much of Tennessee, as being famous for "corn tobacco" and "more fertilizer than any other place in the world".

Fiddler's Jamboree

Joe L. Evins helped start the world-famous Smithville Fiddler's Jamboree & Crafts Festival. The first Jamboree was held in July 1972 on a stage built on the steps of the DeKalb County Courthouse, and has been held there annually on the weekend nearest to July 4. The first Jamboree attracted 714 musicians from 16 states, and was attended by an estimated audience of 8,000. Present day audiences are estimated to be well over 100,000 from all over the U.S., and many from abroad.

Notable people
 Bob Allen, Major League Baseball pitcher
 John Anderson, country music singer
 James Edgar Evins, Tennessee state senator, mayor of Smithville for 16 years.
 Joe L. Evins, U.S. representative
 Alan Jackson, country music singer; former resident
 Greg Tubbs, Major League Baseball Player, Cincinnati Reds, 1993
 Lonnie Mack, pioneering blues-rock guitar soloist lived close by for many years and died here
 Aaron Tippin, country music singer
 Dottie West, American country music singer and songwriter

Gallery

See also
List of bluegrass music festivals

References

External links
City of Smithville official website
City charter

Cities in Tennessee
Cities in DeKalb County, Tennessee
County seats in Tennessee